Curtis Armstrong (born November 27, 1953) is an American actor and singer best known for playing the role of Booger in the Revenge of the Nerds films, Herbert Viola on the TV series Moonlighting, Miles Dalby in the film Risky Business, and record producer Ahmet Ertegun in the film Ray as well as for playing the role of Metatron on the TV series Supernatural.

He is also known for providing his voice for such characters as Schmuley "Snot" Lonstein on the animated TV series American Dad! and Maru in the animated film Planes: Fire & Rescue in addition to portraying the title character on the animated TV series  Dan Vs., Mr. Moleguaco in The Emperor's New School, Ezekiel the Cockroach on Doom Patrol, and Robot Default on Robot and Monster.

From 2013 to 2015, he served as the co-host of the TBS reality television competition series King of the Nerds.

Personal life
Armstrong was born in Detroit, Michigan, the son of Norma E. Armstrong (née D'Amico), a teacher of Italian (Abruzzese) descent, and Robert Leroy Armstrong. During his childhood, he lived in Switzerland for a few years while his father worked there. His family returned to Michigan, and he graduated from Berkley High School in Berkley, Michigan 

Armstrong attended Western Michigan University and later transferred to the Academy of Dramatic Art at Oakland University in Rochester, Michigan, graduating in 1975. 

Armstrong had a Catholic upbringing; he later converted to Judaism when he married Elaine Aronson. His daughter Lily Armstrong was born in 1996. Armstrong announced via social media that his father died on May 25, 2020, of COVID-19.

Career
His first role came in the 1983 film Risky Business. However, he is best known for his role of Booger in Revenge of the Nerds, reprising the role in the  sequels Revenge of the Nerds II: Nerds in Paradise, Revenge of the Nerds III: The Next Generation, and Revenge of the Nerds IV: Nerds in Love. Armstrong's typecasting in the role was mocked in The Simpsons episode "E-I-E-I-(Annoyed Grunt)". His other films include Better Off Dead, Big Bully, One Crazy Summer, Bad Medicine, National Lampoon's Van Wilder, Smokin' Aces, DodgeBall: A True Underdog Story, Jingle All The Way, Southland Tales, and Beer for My Horses. He also had a recurring role as Herbert Viola on the television series Moonlighting, and played the part of Ahmet Ertegun in the biographical film Ray (2004).

Armstrong provided the voices for Mr. Moleguaco and Mr. Bugspit on the Disney Channel original series The Emperor's New School and The Buzz on Maggie. Armstrong was also in Akeelah and the Bee. He played "Farley", a fictional composite character based on members of Elvis Presley's real entourage in the 1997 cult-comedy film Elvis Meets Nixon. He also had a bit part as "Russ" on the short-lived TV show Reaper.

Armstrong was cast in the 2000 film Shanghai Noon as Wild West hawker Bulldog Drummond, but all three scenes in which his character appears were cut from the film during the editing phase. He voices "Snot" on the animated sitcom American Dad!, parodying his role from Revenge of the Nerds. He also had a role as Double Wide in the cartoon series Stroker and Hoop on Adult Swim. He appeared in the 2006 production of Akeelah and the Bee as Mr. Welch. He was on VH1's 100 Greatest Teen Stars despite being thirty when he played his first role. He played "Mecklen" in the 2007 film, Smokin' Aces.

In the feature film Ray, for preparation for his role as music executive Ahmet Ertegun, he had the top part of his head shaved to simulate male pattern baldness. He guest starred in episode 10 — "Much Too Much" — and had a much smaller part in episode 11 — "Owner of a Lonely Heart" — in season two of Grey's Anatomy. Armstrong played a deejay named Jerry Thunder on That '70s Show, episode 315, "Radio Daze." In 2006 Armstrong was in an episode of Boston Legal. In 2008, he guest starred on the iCarly episode "iStakeout" as a convenience store clerk who was suspected of making unauthorized copies of films. In 2009 he appeared in Ratko: The Dictator's Son, and Locker 13. He played fictional astronaut Chaz Dalton on an episode of the TV series My Name is Earl. From 2008–2013 he portrayed Dr Parker/Dr Dawson on The Game.

2009 found Armstrong playing a paranoid character in a mental institution on the House season six premiere, "Broken". Also in 2009 Armstrong appeared in American Pie Presents: The Book of Love, as a teacher obsessed with the principal of the school, and he also appeared as a bumbling bandit in the film Gold Retrievers.

In 2010, Armstrong made a guest appearance on the television show Glory Daze and began voicing the main character on the animated series Dan Vs. He also voices Robot in Robot and Monster. He also appeared on Spike TV's Blue Mountain State (S01E11). In 2011, he appeared on an episode of Curb Your Enthusiasm, and has a recurring role as attorney Peter Goldman on season seven of The Closer. He reprises this role in season four of Major Crimes.

On October 27, 2011, he appeared as himself on the television show Rules of Engagement.

In addition to his acting career, Armstrong's affinity for the music of Harry Nilsson has prompted him to become an enthusiast of Nilsson's work. He has written liner notes for CD reissues of Nilsson albums and has been instrumental in archival and bonus track preparation for these reissues. Additionally, Armstrong is an avid fan of Washington Irving, Laurel and Hardy, and Sir Arthur Conan Doyle's Sherlock Holmes stories.

Armstrong and former Revenge of the Nerds co-star Robert Carradine host the TBS reality TV competition series King of the Nerds. The series, which pits contestants with expertise in a variety of geek interests to see who will be crowned with the eponymous title, premiered in January 2013.

In May 2013, Armstrong appeared as Dr. Foster in an episode of New Girl.

He continued to play the angel Metatron in several episodes in the 9th, 10th and 11th seasons of Supernatural.

Filmography

Film

Television

Video games

Music videos

References

External links

 
 
 

1953 births
Living people
American people of Italian descent
American male film actors
American male television actors
American male video game actors
American male voice actors
Oakland University alumni
Male actors from Detroit
People from Oakland County, Michigan
20th-century American male actors
21st-century American male actors
Converts to Judaism